Stephanie Robison (born August 5, 1976) is a sculpture artist based in Portland, Oregon.

Work
Her work is exemplified by the post-minimalist use of materials (ala Richard Tuttle only much larger, but smaller than Jessica Stockholder's full room works) in a range of tactically diverse ways, such as stuffed fabric, wood, and marble. The effect recalls surrealism, with undertones of disconnected, fluid anatomy. Her installation Wreaking Ball Cloud appeared in the 9th Northwest Biennial 2009 at the Tacoma Art Museum in Tacoma, Washington. She was regularly featured at the Tilt Gallery in Portland, Oregon. Her work has been selected for several juried exhibitions including the Center on Contemporary Art Annual in Seattle and more recently the 10th International Shoebox Sculpture Exhibition at the University of Hawaii. She is currently a tenured faculty member teaching sculpture at City College of San Francisco.

Education
She received her Masters of Fine Arts in Sculpture from the University of Oregon in 2004.

Personal life

References 

Kangas, Matthew. "Seattleites are standouts in otherwise flat CoCA Annual", "Seattle Times", December 8, 2006. Retrieved August 18, 2007
Motley, John. "Paper Fences", "Portland Mercury", February 9, 2006. Retrieved August 18, 2007

External links 
Stephanie Robison official site
Tilt Gallery website

1976 births
Living people
Artists from Portland, Oregon
City College of San Francisco faculty